Spain–Uruguay refers to the current and historical relations between Spain and Uruguay. There is community of 67,000 Spanish nationals residing in Uruguay and 33,000 Uruguayan nationals residing in Spain. Both nations are members of the Association of Spanish Language Academies, Organization of Ibero-American States and the United Nations.

History

Spanish colonization
In 1516, the first European to arrive to present-day Uruguay was Spanish explorer Juan Díaz de Solís. In 1526, explorer Sebastian Cabot named the land "Banda Oriental del Uruguay", however, he did not establish any settlements in the land as he believed it to be unattractive for settlement. In the 1620s, Jesuit and Franciscan missionaries established the first missions in Banda Oriental. By the late 1600s, Spanish settlers came to Banda Oriental for cattle raising. In 1776, Banda Oriental officially became part of the Spanish Empire and was governed from the Viceroyalty of the Río de la Plata based in Buenos Aires.

Independence
In 1810, a movement for independence broke out in Buenos Aires and it influenced the move for independence in Banda Oriental. In 1811, General José Gervasio Artigas led the independence movement in Banda Oriental and raised an army and fought against Spanish troops in the territory. In May 1811, General Artigas fought a successful battle against Spanish troops known as the Battle of Las Piedras. General Artigas was later seen as a threat by commanders in Buenos Aires who saw the Banda Oriental as a province of Rio de la Plata and not as a separate territory. In 1820, the commanders of Buenos Aires acquiesced when Portuguese Brazilian forces took over the Banda Oriental and forced Artigas into exile.

In 1825, the Thirty-Three Orientals entered into Uruguay and fought against Brazilian troops. In 1828 a treaty was signed between Brazil and Argentina which allowed for the Banda Oriental to become an independent nation. The new country was then to become known as Uruguay.

Post independence

On 19 July 1870, both Spain and Uruguay established diplomatic relations and signed a Treaty of Peace and Friendship. After the establishment of diplomatic relations, thousands of Spanish nationals immigrated to Uruguay. In 1908, over 30% of Uruguays population were born in Spain.

During the Spanish Civil War (1936-1939) approximately 70 Uruguayans fought in the international brigade against the Nationalist faction. In 1936, Uruguayan President Gabriel Terra recognized the government of Francisco Franco. Between the years of 1946 - 1958, over 37,000 Spanish citizens immigrated to Uruguay. Most Spanish migrants came to Uruguay escaping poverty in Spain. Some of them were also political refugees fleeing from Franco's dictatorship.

In May 1983, Spanish King Juan Carlos I paid an official visit to Uruguay. During his visit, the King met with the leaders of the Civic-military dictatorship of Uruguay to discuss a possible transition to democracy in the country. The King would return to Uruguay in November 1996 and once more in November 2006 to attend the 16th Ibero-American Summit being held in Montevideo.

Bilateral relations
Over the years, both nations have signed numerous agreements such as a Treaty on Arbitration (1922); Treaty of Trade (1957); Elimination of visas (1961); Treaty on Cultural Exchanges (1964); Tourism Agreement (1969); Atomic Energy Agreement for Peaceful Purposes (1979); Investment Protection Agreement (1992); Extradition Treaty (1996); Agreement to avoid Double Taxation (2011) and a Cooperation in Defense Agreement (2015).

Transportation
There are direct flights between Madrid and Montevideo with Air Europa and Iberia airlines.

Trade
In 2018, trade between Spain and Uruguay totaled €232 million Euros. Spain has US$470 million worth of investments in Uruguay. Spanish multinational companies such as Banco Bilbao Vizcaya Argentaria, Banco Santander, Mapfre and Zara (among others) operate in Uruguay.

Resident diplomatic missions
 Spain has an embassy in Montevideo.
 Uruguay has an embassy in Madrid and consulates-general in Barcelona, Las Palmas de Gran Canaria, Santiago de Compostela, and Valencia.

See also 
 Spanish Uruguayans
 Uruguayans in Spain

References 

 
Uruguay
Bilateral relations of Uruguay